Elena is a popular female given name of Greek origin. The name means "shining light". Nicknames of the name Elena are Lena, Lennie, Ella, Ellie, Nellie or Nena (less common).

Other common variants are Alena (German, Czech, Russian, Belarusian, Serbian, Croatian); Alenka (Slovenian); Alyona (Russian); Elene (Georgian); Helen (English); Hélène (French); Helena (Latin, Polish); Eliana (Portuguese); Eline (Dutch, Norwegian, Sranan Tongo); Ileana (Romanian, Italian, Spanish); Ilona (Hungarian, Finnish, Latvian); Olena (Ukrainian); and Elena/Yelena/Jelena (Russian, Serbian, Croatian).

Notable people

Given name

A–K
 Elena Abelson (1904–1993), better known as Tamara Talbot Rice, Russian-English art historian
 Elena Altieri, Italian actress
 Elena Anaya, Spanish actress
 Elena Arzhakova (born 1989), Russian runner who specializes in the middle distance events
 Elena Asimakopoulou, Greek model
 Elena Baltacha (1983–2014), British tennis player, born in Kiev
 Elena Berezhnaya, Russian pair skater
 Elena Bogdan (born 1992), Romanian tennis player
 Infanta Elena, Duchess of Lugo, (born 1963), Infanta of Spain and Duchess of Lugo
 Elena Bovina (born 1983), Russian tennis player
 Elena Brambilla (1942–2018), Italian historian
 Elena Braverman, Russian, Israeli, and Canadian mathematician
 Elena Carapetis, Greek-Australian actress
 Elena Ceaușescu (1916–1989), wife of former Romanian head of state Nicolae Ceaușescu
 Elena Dahl (born 1947), Russian-Swedish author and translator.
 Elena Delle Donne (born 1989), American basketball player
 Elena Dementieva (born 1981), Russian former tennis player
 Elena Eremina (born 2001), Russian artistic gymnast
 Elena Eskina (born 1976), retired Russian field hockey player and umpire
 Elena Ferrante (active 1992–present), pseudonymous Italian novelist
 Elena Fiore, Italian actress
 Elena Gerasimova (born 2004), Russian artistic gymnast
 Elena Gheorghe, Romanian singer; known for her hits "The Balkan Girls" and "Disco Romancing"
 Elena Goode (born 1983), American actress
 Ellie Goulding (born 1986), British singer-songwriter, born Elena Jane Goulding
 Elena Grushina, Ukrainian figure skater
 Elena Hila, Romanian shot putter
 Elena Huelva (2002–2023), Spanish cancer activist and writer
 Elena Ierodiakonou, Cypriot model
 Elena Kagan (born 1960), former United States Solicitor General and current Associate Justice of the Supreme Court of the United States
 Elena Kats-Chernin (born 1957), Australian composer
 Elena Khatzisavva, Cypriot gymnast
 Elena Kosmina,  Ukrainian beauty queen and model
 Elena Kountoura, Greek ex-model and politician

L–Z
 Elena Ledda, Sardinian singer
 Elena Liashenko, Ukrainian figure skater
 Elena Likhovtseva (born 1975), Russian tennis player
 Elena Lobsanova, Russian-Canadian ballet dancer
 Elena Manuele (born 2003), Italian singer
 Elena Mousikou, Cypriot archer
 Elena Nathanael, Greek actress
 Elena Nikolaidi, Greek-American opera singer
 Elena Nikoli, Greek handball player
 Elena Obraztsova (1930–2015), Russian operatic mezzo-soprano
 Elena Pampoulova (born 1972), Bulgarian tennis player
 Elena Panaritis, Greek economist
 Elena Paparizou, Greek singer
 Princess Elena of Montenegro (Princess Elena Petrović-Njegoš of Montenegro, 1873–1952), wife of King Victor Emmanuel III of Italy
 Elena Poniatowska, Mexican journalist and author
 Elena Moldovan Popoviciu, Romanian mathematician
 Elena Rigas (born 1996), Danish speed skater
 Elena Rybakina (born 1999), Russian-Kazakhstani tennis player
 Elena Salgado (born 1949), Spanish politician
 Elena Shimko (born 1982), Russian badminton player
 Elena Siegman, American singer
 Elena Skordelli, Cypriot television presenter
 Elena Souliotis, Greek opera singer
 Elena Stasova, Russian communist revolutionary
 Elena Tatarkova (born 1976), Ukrainian former tennis player
 Elena Temnikova, Russian singer, television personality and fashion designer
 Elena Jane Tucker, Australian geneticist
 Elena Udrea, Romanian politician; Minister of Tourism
 Elena Urlaeva (born 1961), Uzbek human rights activist
 Elena Vaenga, Russian singer, songwriter and actress
 Elena Vesnina (born 1986), Russian tennis player
 Elena Votsi, Greek designer
 Elena Waiss (1908-1988), Chilean pianist
Elena Whitham (born 1974), British politician
 Elena Zamolodchikova, Russian gymnast
 Elena Zelenskaya, Russian soprano

Middle name 
 Maria Elena Camerin (born 1982), Italian tennis player
 Maria Elena Kyriakou  (born 1984), Greek Cypriot singer
 Flor Elena González, Venezuelan telenovela actress

In fiction
 Elena Tyler, a character portrayed by Tangi Miller on the 1998–2002 Warner Bros. series Felicity
 Elena Fisher, a character in the Uncharted series
 Elena Gilbert, from The Vampire Diaries
 Elena Michaels, in the Women of the Otherworld series
 Elena Ramos, from Dallas
 Elena of Turks, from Final Fantasy VII
 Elena (Street Fighter), from Street Fighter III
 Elena Potato, from the comic book and animated series Monster Allergy
 Elena, a Soviet scientist in the Stanley Kubrick film 2001: A Space Odyssey
 Elena, a fictional character played by Hazera Ambce in the British web series Corner Shop Show
 Elena a priestess from Grandia II
 Elena, a lord and the illegitimate daughter of Thomas Covenant
 Elena, an 18-year-old girl from the Wii game Pandora's Tower
 Elena Castillo Flores, a Disney princess from the animated television series Elena of Avalor
 Elena Alvarez, teenage daughter on One Day at a Time (2017 TV series)
 Elena Bothari-Jesek, a childhood friend of Miles' and later a leader of the Dendarii Free Mercenary Fleet from the Vorkosigan Saga
 Elena, played by Vera Filatova, is a resident of Apollo House and one of Jez's love interests in Peep Show (British TV series)
 Elena Greco, character in the Neapolitan Novels, a 4-part series by the Italian author Elena Ferrante
Elena de la Vega, character from "The Mask of Zorro," a 1998 motion picture
Elena Cañero-Reed, the main character from the tv show Diary of a Future President

See also 
 
 Elena (disambiguation)
 Lena (name)

Notes 

Russian feminine given names
Romanian feminine given names
Spanish feminine given names
Portuguese feminine given names
Italian feminine given names
Slovene feminine given names
Serbian feminine given names
Croatian feminine given names
Latvian feminine given names
Lithuanian feminine given names
Georgian feminine given names
Greek feminine given names
Macedonian feminine given names
Bulgarian feminine given names
Polish feminine given names
Czech feminine given names
Slovak feminine given names
Ukrainian feminine given names
Given names of Greek language origin

de:Elena